Amy Silverman is an American author, journalist, blogger, and National Public Radio contributor. She is former Managing Editor at Phoenix New Times and is a commentator for KJZZ, the National Public Radio affiliate in Phoenix. Her work has appeared on the radio show This American Life and in The New York Times. She has a master's in journalism from Columbia University. Her memoir, My Heart Can't Even Believe It, was published by Woodbine Press in May 2016; it accounts for her experience raising a daughter with Down syndrome.

References

External links
 Official Author Site
 Author Blog

1967 births
Living people
American women journalists
Columbia University Graduate School of Journalism alumni
21st-century American women